Cephena is a genus of moths of the family Erebidae. The genus was erected by Frederic Moore in 1882.

Species
Cephena costata Moore, 1882 (India, Taiwan, Thailand, Sumatra, Borneo)
Cephena sundana Holloway (Borneo, Peninsular Malaysia, Sumatra)

References

Calpinae
Moth genera